720 (seven hundred [and] twenty) is the natural number following 719 and preceding 721.

It is 6! (6 factorial), a composite number with thirty divisors, more than any number below, making it a highly composite number. It is a Harshad number in every base from binary to decimal.

There are 49 solutions to the equation φ(x) = 720, more than any integer below it, making 720 a highly totient number.

720 is a 241-gonal number.

In other fields

720 is:
 A common vertical display resolution for HDTV (see 720p).
 720° is two full rotations; the term "720" refers to a skateboarding trick.
 720° is also the name of a skateboarding video game.
 720 is a dual area code in the Denver Metro Area along with 303.
 720° is the sum of all the defects of any polyhedron.
 720 is a short form of saying Boeing 720, an airliner which is no longer in service.

For the year AD, see 720.

References

Integers